Otanmäki is a village to the south-west of Kajaani, Finland. Otanmäki is located in Vuolijoki within the bounds of the City of Kajaani municipality.

The railway rolling stock manufacturer Škoda Transtech Oy has a factory in Otanmäki, which has produced many of VR's railway carriages.

External links
Škoda Transtech Oy

Kajaani
Villages in Finland